The Asylum and Immigration (Treatment of Claimants, etc.) Act 2004 (c 19) is an Act of the Parliament of the United Kingdom. It set various rules for immigrants to the United Kingdom. In 2006, section 19 of the Act was declared to be incompatible with the Convention for the Protection of Human Rights and Fundamental Freedoms under section 4 of the Human Rights Act 1998.

Section 19 dealt the problem of so-called "sham marriages", where immigrants marry British citizens merely to gain leave to stay. In a case heard by the High Court of Justice in 2006, Mr Justice Stephen Silber ruled that as the section made an exemption for marriages held in the Anglican church, it discriminated against non-Anglicans.

Section 48 - Commencement
Section 48(2) provides that section 32(1) has effect in relation to determinations of the Special Immigration Appeals Commission made after the end of the period of two months that began on the date on which this Act was passed. The word "months" means calendar months. The day (that is to say, 22 July 2004) on which the Act was passed (that is to say, received royal assent) is included in the period of two months. This means that section 32(1) has effect in relation to determinations of the Special Immigration Appeals Commission made after 22 September 2004.

The following orders have been made under this section:
The Asylum and Immigration (Treatment of Claimants, etc.) Act 2004 (Commencement No. 1) Order 2004 (S.I. 2004/2523 (C. 105))
The Asylum and Immigration (Treatment of Claimants, etc.) Act 2004 (Commencement No. 2) Order 2004 (S.I. 2004/2999 (C. 125))
The Asylum and Immigration (Treatment of Claimants, etc.) Act 2004 (Commencement No. 3) Order 2004 (S.I. 2004/3398 (C. 159))
The Asylum and Immigration (Treatment of Claimants, etc.) Act 2004 (Commencement No. 4) Order 2005 (S.I. 2005/372 (C. 15))
The Asylum and Immigration (Treatment of Claimants, etc.) Act 2004 (Commencement No. 5 and Transitional Provisions) Order 2005 (S.I. 2005/565 (C. 25))
The Asylum and Immigration (Treatment of Claimants, etc.) Act 2004 (Commencement No. 6) Order 2006 (S.I. 2006/1517 (C. 53))
The Asylum and Immigration (Treatment of Claimants, etc.) Act 2004 (Commencement No. 7 and Transitional Provisions) Order 2007 (S.I. 2007/1602 (C. 64))
The Asylum and Immigration (Treatment of Claimants, etc.) Act 2004 (Commencement No. 1) (Northern Ireland) Order 2007 (S.I. 2007/845 (C. 33))
The Asylum and Immigration (Treatment of Claimants etc.) Act 2004 (Commencement) (Scotland) Order 2004 (S.I. 2004/494 (C. 35))

Extent
This Act extends to England and Wales, Scotland, and Northern Ireland, except that an amendment effected by this Act has the same extent as the enactment, or as the relevant part of the enactment, amended (ignoring extent by virtue of an Order in Council).

As to the extension of this Act to the Isle of Man, see articles 18 and 19 of, and Schedule 8 and Part 6 of Schedule 10 to, the Immigration (Isle of Man) Order 2008 (S.I. 2008/680), and article 8 of the Asylum and Immigration (Treatment of Claimants, etc.) Act 2004 (Remedial) Order 2011 (S.I. 2011/1158), and article 2 of, and paragraphs 7 and 15 of the Schedule to, the Immigration (Isle of Man) (Amendment) Order 2011 (S.I. 2011/1408).

See also
Immigration Act

References
Halsbury's Statutes,

External links
Guardian news article about the High Court ruling

UK Legislation 

Explanatory notes to the Asylum and Immigration (Treatment of Claimants, etc.) Act 2004.

2006 in British law
United Kingdom Acts of Parliament 2004
Immigration law in the United Kingdom
Right of asylum legislation in the United Kingdom
Immigration legislation
Sham marriage